Rhombodus is a prehistoric genus of ray belonging to the family Rhombodontidae.

Species within this genus lived from the Cretaceous period, Maastrichtian age to the Paleocene epoch, from 70.6 to 55.8 million years ago.

Species
Species within this genus include:
Rhombodus andriesi  Noubhani and Cappetta 1994
Rhombodus binkhorsti Dames, 1881 North America
Rhombodus bondoni  Arambourg 1952
Rhombodus carentonensis  Vullo 2005
Rhombodus ibericus  Kriwet et al. 2007
Rhombodus laevis  Cappetta and Case 1975
Rhombodus meridionalis  Arambourg 1952
Rhombodus microdon  Arambourg 1952

Description
This genus is known from its caudal spines and rhombic teeth, which are all that usually fossilises.

Distribution
Fossils have been found in the sediments of Africa, Europe, Asia and the Americas.

See also
 Flora and fauna of the Maastrichtian stage
 List of prehistoric cartilaginous fish (Chondrichthyes)

References

Rajiformes
Cretaceous fish of Asia
Paleocene fish of Asia
Prehistoric fish of Africa